Schinia chilensis is a moth of the family Noctuidae. It is endemic to Chile.

External links
Lista de géneros y especies de lepidópteros nóctuidos representados en las Colecciones Científicas de la Universidad de Concepción
A Description of a New Subspecies of Helicoverpa pallida Hardwick With Notes on the Heliothidinae (Lepidoptera: Noctuidae) - Chloridea chilensis (Hamp.) is transferred to the genus Schinia

Schinia
Moths of South America
Endemic fauna of Chile
Moths described in 1903